The Bodyguard (Telokhranitel) is a 1979 Soviet action film released by Tadjikfilm. It is one of the best known of the Red Westerns and directed by the veteran feature and documentary maker, Ali Khamraev.

Plot
The setting is Central Asia during the Russian Civil War. In the post-revolutionary twenties, when the power in European Russia was (officially) "fully in the hands of the workers and peasants", but the fight against the Basmachi rebels was in full swing. When a Red Army detachment captures Sultan Nazar (Anatoly Solonitsyn), the brains behind the Basmachi contingent, a decision is made to escort urgently the prisoner to the Bukhara province. The difficult mission is entrusted to a grizzled mountain trapper and conscientious revolutionary Mirzo. His expertise is essential to traverse the precarious paths and steep mountain ridges along the way, impossible terrain for the inexperienced. A group consisting of Mirzo (Alexander Kaidanovsky), his brother Kova, the Sultan, his daughter Zarangis (D. Alimova) and slave Saifulla set off on this journey, pursued doggedly along the way by Fottabek (Shavkat Abdusalyamov), the ruthless new head of the Basmachis. They are forced to fight on the mountain ridges as well as negotiate the natural dangers and harsh elements.

Cast
Alexander Kaidanovsky (voiced by Sergey Shakurov) - Mirzo
Anatoly Solonitsyn - Sultan Nazar
Shavkat Abdusalyamov (dubbed by Oleg Yankovsky) - Fottabek
Gulcha Tashbaeva - Aibash, wife of Fottabek
Nikolai Grinko - Nikolai Grigorievich, border guard commander
D. Alimova - Zaranghis, daughter of Nazar
G. Igamberdyev - Kula, younger brother of Mirzo
Saidmurad Ziyautdinov - Saifulo, servant of Nazar
Bolot Beishenaliev - Mashrab, sorcerer, shaman
Rajab Adashev - Utash Ahmad Dodho
Sh. Mavlyanov - Basmachi
Saidmurad Saidmuradov - Nazar-aka, old hermit
Anvar Alimov

References

External links

Ostern films
1979 films
1979 in the Soviet Union
Films scored by Eduard Artemyev
1970s Russian-language films
Russian Civil War films
1979 Western (genre) films
Soviet action films